South Hill is a census-designated place (CDP) in Tompkins County, New York, United States. The population was 7,245 at the 2020 census.

The South Hill CDP is located within the town of Ithaca. It is located near the south end of Cayuga Lake. The name South Hill is shared with a contiguous area within the City of Ithaca.

Ithaca College is located in the South Hill CDP.

Geography
South Hill is located at  (42.411598, -76.490605).

Demographics

As of the census of 2000, there were 6,003 people, 1,073 households, and 491 families residing in the CDP. The population density was 1,015.7 per square mile (392.2/km2). There were 1,139 housing units at an average density of 192.7/sq mi (74.4/km2). The racial makeup of the CDP was 91.64% White, 2.42% African American, 0.13% Native American, 1.77% Asian, 0.03% Pacific Islander, 1.78% from other races, and 2.23% from two or more races. Hispanic or Latino of any race were 2.77% of the population.

There were 1,073 households, out of which 22.6% had children under the age of 18 living with them, 37.9% were married couples living together, 5.0% had a female householder with no husband present, and 54.2% were non-families. 31.6% of all households were made up of individuals, and 15.9% had someone living alone who was 65 years of age or older. The average household size was 2.44 and the average family size was 2.90.

In the CDP, the population was spread out, with 7.1% under the age of 18, 69.3% from 18 to 24, 9.2% from 25 to 44, 8.6% from 45 to 64, and 5.7% who were 65 years of age or older. The median age was 20 years. For every 100 females, there were 83.7 males. For every 100 females age 18 and over, there were 82.3 males.

The median income for a household in the CDP was $43,868, and the median income for a family was $66,364. Males had a median income of $44,500 versus $28,491 for females. The per capita income for the CDP was $11,495. None of the families and 23.1% of the population were living below the poverty line, including no under eighteens and 5.6% of those over 64.

References

Census-designated places in New York (state)
Census-designated places in Tompkins County, New York